= Skyport Radio =

Former pirate radio station

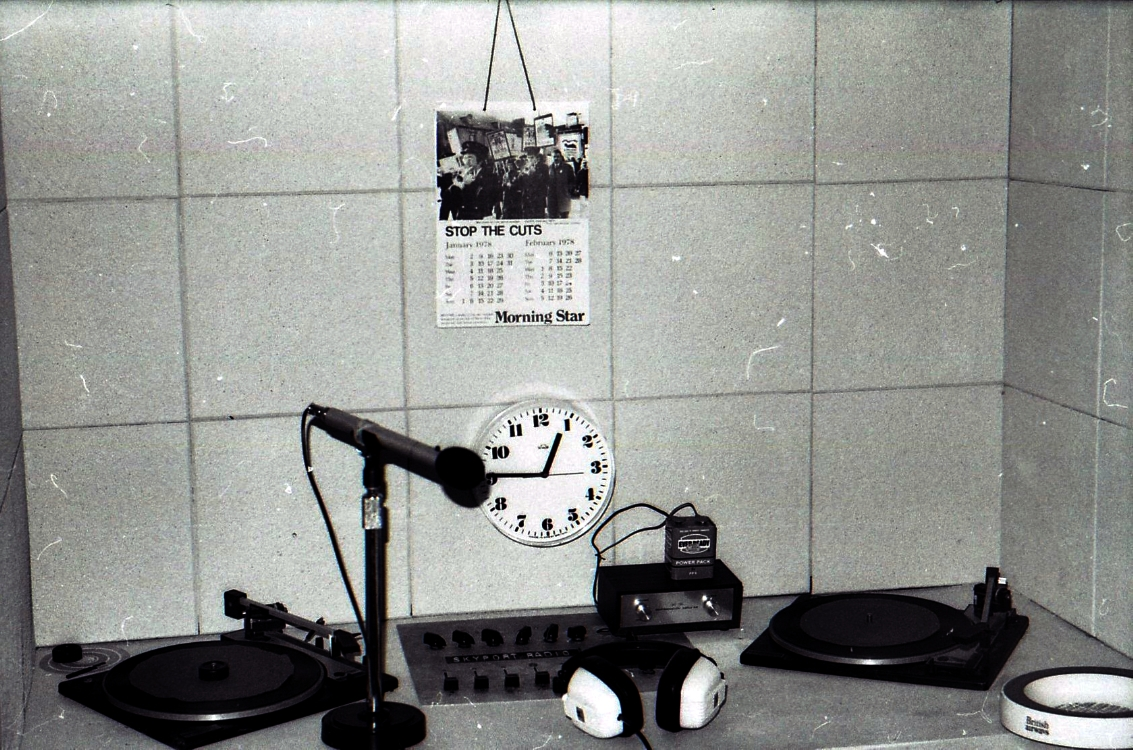
- Broadcast area: Europe

Programming
- Language: English

History
- First air date: 1971; 54 years ago

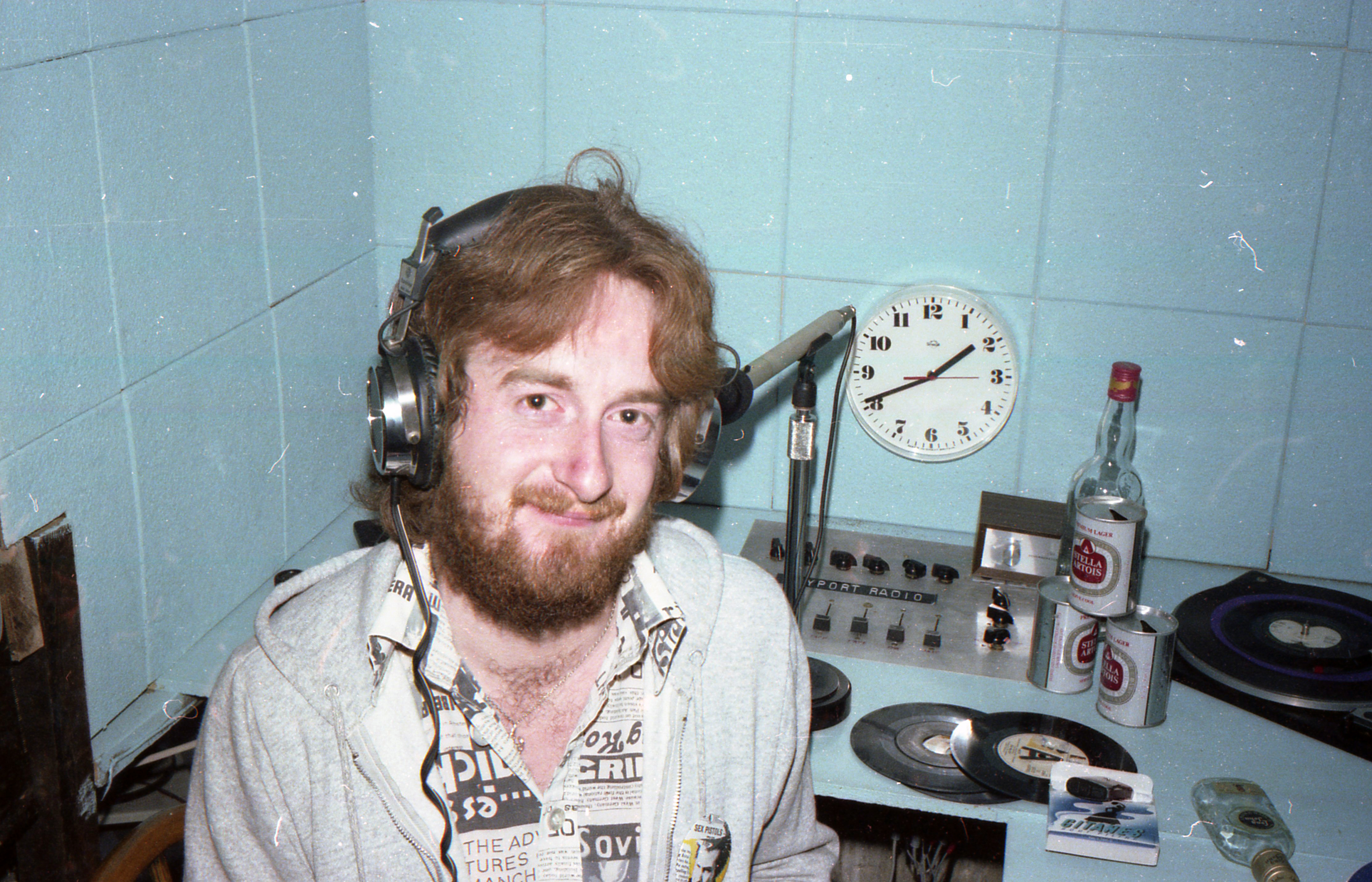
Terry Anderson DJ

Skyport Radio was a land-based Short Wave pirate station which broadcast to Europe from 1971 to 1982, it was the only UK based pirate station to have a left-wing slant to its programmes.

There is an entry for the station in the 1978 edition of the World Radio & TV Handbook on page 43 of the appendix.

Skyport Radio operators were concerned about another pirate station Radio Enoch's far-right broadcasts, and sent listeners Communist Party of Great Britain anti-National Front leaflets, but the station was never officially connected to the Communist party. On visiting the station in 1974 the CPGB Feltham branch secretary (David Howell MBE 1943–2014,) said the station could not be endorsed by the party as it was unlicensed.

There is an article written in October 2019 about how Skyport Radio has been used as part of an art exhibit, this can be found at the site of the artist Dr. Magz Hall.

According to their official website they have made several broadcasts in 2021 to mark their 50th Anniversary these have been streamed from Prague, Czechia and Medellín, Colombia and were broadcast on a local FM station in Prague. More streamed programming has been announced as originating from a studio in Falmouth UK.
